The Archeparchy of Ternopil - Zboriv is an ecclesiastical territory or ecclesiastical province of the Ukrainian Greek Catholic Church — a particular Eastern Catholic Church, that is located in Ukraine. It was erected in 1807. As a metropolitan see, it has two suffragan sees — Buchach and Kamyanets-Podilskyi. The incumbent Metropolitan Archbishop is Vasyl Semeniuk. The cathedral church of the archeparchy is the Cathedral of the Immaculate Conception of the Holy Mother of God in the city of Ternopil.

History
April 20, 1993: Established as Eparchy of Ternopil from the Ukrainian Catholic Archeparchy of Lviv.
July 21, 2000: Lost territory to establish the Ukrainian Catholic Eparchy of Buchach.
July 21, 2000: Gained territory from the suppressed Ukrainian Catholic Eparchy of Zboriv and renamed as Eparchy of Ternopil – Zboriv.
November 21, 2011: Elevated as Archeparchy of Ternopil - Zboriv.
December 11, 2015: Lost territory to restore the Ukrainian Catholic Eparchy of Kamyanets-Podilskyi.

Eparchial and auxiliary bishops
The following is a list of the bishops and archbishops of Ternopil - Zboriv and their terms of service:
 Eparchy of Ternopil
(20 Apr 1993 – 29 Jun 2006) Mykhaylo Sabryha, C.S.S.R.
 (10 Feb 2004 – 19 Oct 2006) Vasyl Semeniuk, titular bishop of Castra Severiana, auxiliary 
(19 Oct 2006 – 22 Dec 2011) Vasyl Semeniuk ( see below)

 Archeparchy of Ternopil - Zboriv
(since 22 Dec 2011 – ) Vasyl Semeniuk (see above)
 (since 12 Mar 2015 – ) Teodor Martynyuk, M.S.U., titular bishop of Mopta, auxiliary

Gallery of eparchies

External links

GCatholic.org information on the eparchy
Profile atCatholic Hierarchy

Ternopil - Zboriv
Christian organizations established in 1993